Molloy Island is a small townsite located in the South West region of Western Australia in the Shire of Augusta-Margaret River, specifically on the island in the Blackwood River.

The island was the location of an attempt at possum farming in the 1920s.

References

External links 

Towns in Western Australia
South West (Western Australia)